John Michael William Curphey Forrestall (September 23, 1932 – June 8, 2006), known as Michael Forrestall, was a Canadian politician. Forrestall served in both the Senate of Canada and House of Commons of Canada.

Political career
A Nova Scotia journalist and businessman, Forrestall was first elected to the House of Commons of Canada in the 1965 federal election as the Progressive Conservative Member of Parliament (MP) for Halifax, Nova Scotia. He was elected the MP for Dartmouth—Halifax East in the 1968 election, and remained in the House for a total of twenty-three years.

During the Brian Mulroney government, Forrestall served as a parliamentary secretary to a succession of ministers until he was defeated in what was by then the riding of Dartmouth in the 1988 federal election. In November 1990, Prime Minister Mulroney appointed Forrestall to the Senate of Canada, where he sat as a Progressive Conservative until February 2004, when he and most of the Tory caucus joined the new Conservative Party of Canada. Forrestall was active on a number of causes, including benefits for Canadian Merchant Navy veterans and the protection of lighthouses.

In 2000, he introduced a Private Members Bill in the Senate Heritage Lighthouse Protection Act, a bill which was also supported by Senator Pat Carney who championed it after Forrestall's death and which is close to passing in the House of Commons in 2007. Forrestall's brother is the Canadian realist painter, Tom Forrestall; their sister Katherine was the mother of singer-songwriter Matthew Grimson.

Death
Forrestall died on June 8, 2006, at age 73; he had been admitted to a Halifax-area hospital with serious breathing problems five days earlier.

Electoral history

References

1932 births
2006 deaths
Canadian people of Irish descent
Conservative Party of Canada senators
Members of the House of Commons of Canada from Nova Scotia
Canadian senators from Nova Scotia
Progressive Conservative Party of Canada MPs
Progressive Conservative Party of Canada senators
People from Annapolis County, Nova Scotia
Place of birth missing
21st-century Canadian politicians